Lodzer veker (לאדזשער וועקער⁩⁩; וועכענטלעכע ארבעטער צייטונג, Lodzsher veker) was a newspaper of the General Jewish Labour Bund in Łódź, Poland. In 1922, it was taken over by the Jewish Communist Labour Bund. The General Jewish Labour Bund restarted the newspaper in October 1926, as a weekly.

References
2. https://www.nli.org.il/he/newspapers/lzw

Bundism in Europe
Publications with year of establishment missing
Defunct newspapers published in Poland
Jewish anti-Zionism in Poland
Jews and Judaism in Łódź
Yiddish communist newspapers
20th century in Łódź
Yiddish-language mass media in Poland
Weekly newspapers published in Poland